The American Soccer Association Cup was an open cup-tie competition that took place in 1929. The entires for this tournament were the ASL teams and amateur clubs from the Southern New York State Association. The amateur clubs played the early rounds to earn the right to play off against the ASL entrants in the final stages.  The tournament ran from February to May. The sixth round which constituted the tournament proper included the seven ASL teams and the only amateur side to qualify, the Brooklyn Celtics. The final was played over two legs with Providence gaining the title over the New York Nationals with a 4-2 win on May 20 after the teams drew 2-2 on May 18. A May 19 game was played but officials called the game on account of weather and continued as an exhibition match with the teams playing to a 4-4 draw. This tournament was not continued as the 'Soccer War' was later resolved.

Second round

Third round

Fourth round

Fifth round

Tournament proper

Quarterfinals

Semifinals

Final

Replay

See also
1929 National Challenge Cup

References

Sources
New York Times
Boston Globe
Providence Journal
Pawtucket Times
Brooklyn Daily Eagle
Yonkers Herald
Stamford Advocate
Glen Cove Record 
The Daily Item
La Prensa

Amer
New York Nationals (ASL)
Defunct soccer competitions in the United States
Soccer cup competitions in the United States